The goldeye (Hiodon alosoides) is a freshwater fish found in Canada and the northern United States.  It is one of only two extant species in the family Hiodontidae, the other species being Hiodon tergisus.  The species name alosoides means shad-like. It is also called Winnipeg goldeye, western goldeye, yellow herring, toothed herring, shad mooneye, la Queche, weepicheesis, or laquaiche aux yeux d’or in French.

Morphology
Goldeyes are recognizable by their silver compressed body form and their large gold eyes.  Their body appears to be a blue-green silver from above and a more white silver from below.  They have two abdominal and pelvic fins as well as a dorsal on their back and an anal fin on their underside.  The dorsal fin is positioned opposite or behind the origin of the anal fin.  Goldeyes also have a fleshy keel that extends from the pectoral fins to the base of the anal fin. Their mouth is large and in the terminal position with a blunt round snout. The Goldeye fish has cycloid scales that lack spines.  They also have a sensory system known as the lateral line system.  Adults are usually about  but can reach . Goldeyes typically weigh only .

Reproduction
The age of first reproduction for goldeyes is 7–10 years for females and 6–9 years for males. They spawn in late May or early June. This is a rare trait in fresh water fish, but is more common in marine fish. The eggs are suspended in the water and they drift downstream or to quiet waters. The majority of growth that occurs between June and September.

Range
Goldeyes occur from as far down the Mackenzie River as Aklavik in the north to Mississippi in the south, and from Alberta in the west to Ohio south of the Great Lakes, with an isolated population south of James Bay. It prefers turbid slower-moving waters of lakes and rivers.

Diet
Goldeyes feed on insects, crustaceans, fish, frogs.

Fishing
The goldeye is considered a good fly-fishing fish, but not popular with most anglers because of its small size. It is one of 122 new species of animals, birds, fish documented by the Lewis & Clark Corps of Discovery. Commercial fishing of this species was reported as early as 1876.  Its fresh flesh is soft and unappealing, so it was only taken randomly in gillnets and (in the past) sold for dogfood. They are now sought after by many consumers as a smoked fish. Many commercial fishermen sell them smoked after being processed (marinated) in a brine made of spices, salt, brown sugar, and other secret ingredients. They are smoked in oak wood, apple wood, or other woods. Each producer has their own ways of smoking. Despite its soft flesh the goldeye may be soaked in a salt brine for 24 hours and then poached, firming up the flesh.

Its commercial viability was realized by Robert Firth, who immigrated to Winnipeg, Manitoba from Hull, England in 1886.  Firth was carrying on a mediocre trade in cold-smoked goldeye, when he miscalculated the heat of his smoker and accidentally developed the now-standard method of hot-smoking it whole.  The bright red or orange colour of the smoked fish resulted from using only willow smoke, but today is achieved through aniline dye. It became a fashionable gourmet dish after 1911, with Woodrow Wilson and the Prince of Wales counted amongst its fans.  In 1926–29 the annual catch exceeded a million pounds, but stocks declined from 1931 and little was fished from Lake Winnipeg after 1938.  A small amount of the commercial harvest is shipped to the United States, but most is consumed in Canada.  Although Lake Winnipeg was once the main commercial source, it now comes from elsewhere, especially in Saskatchewan and Alberta, and the culinary name Winnipeg goldeye has come to be associated with the city where it is processed.

The fish is the namesake of Winnipeg's minor league baseball team, the Winnipeg Goldeyes.

See also
 List of smoked foods

Notes

References

 
 
 
 Goldeye in Fisheries and Oceans Canada's Underwater World
 
 

Hiodontidae
Smoked fish
Fish described in 1819
Freshwater fish of North America
Cuisine of Manitoba